is a Kanō-school byōbu or folding  screen  attributed to the Japanese painter Kanō Eitoku (1543–1590), one of the most prominent patriarchs of the Kanō school of Japanese painting.  The painting dates to the Azuchi–Momoyama period  (1573–). Now in Tokyo National Museum, it has been designated a National Treasure.

Painting
This  Japanese folding screen was made from several joined panels. Screens were used to separate interiors and enclose private spaces, among other uses. This work is considered a representative work of Eitoku, who pioneered the bold "colour and gold" style. The painting is a polychrome-and-gold screen that depicts a cypress  tree against the backdrop of gold-leafed  clouds, and surrounded by the dark blue waters of a pond. The painting stretches across two four-panel folding screens from circa 1590; it is made of paper covered with gold leaf, depicting a cypress tree, a symbol of longevity in Japan.

Background
Commonly attributed to Kanō Eitoku (1543–1590), there is another theory based on a reference to a commission in  that the painting was instead made by Eitoku's younger brother . The eight panels originally took the form of four painted shōji, later remounted, which helps account for some of the discontinuities in the image. After the Meiji Restoration the paintings passed from the Katsura-no-miya to the Imperial Household and thence to the nation.

See also
 List of National Treasures of Japan (paintings)

References

External links
 Entry at National Treasures & Important Cultural Properties of National Museums, Japan

National Treasures of Japan
Japanese paintings
Landscape paintings
Byōbu
Paintings in the collection of the Tokyo National Museum